Thomas de Lacy Moffatt (17 April 1824 – 2 October 1864), was a politician in colonial Queensland, and a Treasurer of Queensland.  His surname is also sometimes spelled "Moffat".

Early life
Moffatt was born in 1824 in Athlone, County Westmeath, Ireland, the son of James Moffatt, the rector of Athlone, and his wife Elizabeth née Kellett.  He set out for Australia in 1844 and worked with his uncle, Captain R. G. Moffatt, a former magistrate and commander of the military police in Port Stephens who by that time had turned his attention to agriculture and sheep farming.  He later moved north and became a squatter, establishing a station called "Callandoon" on the Darling Downs.  He sold the station in 1849 and moved to the town of Drayton. In 1852, the pastoral run Woondul was transferred from Moffat to Russell H. Stuart.

Political career
Moffatt was elected to the first Legislative Assembly of Queensland on 27 April 1860 for the district of Western Downs. Moffatt became Colonial Treasurer in the first Robert Herbert Ministry on 4 August 1862, and retained this post till his death on 2 October 1864.

References

1826 births
1864 deaths
Members of the Queensland Legislative Assembly
Treasurers of Queensland
People from County Westmeath
Irish emigrants to Australia
19th-century Australian politicians